Rafael Ojeda Rojas (Seville, 1978), better known as Falete, is a flamenco singer from Seville, Spain.

His father was a founding member of the musical group Cantores de Híspalis, and he made his debut in the Teatro Lope de Vega, Seville when he was 15 years old, dedicating his performance to La Chunga. 
In the 1990s, he took part in several event in different cities all over the world (Danzas de España, etc.)

He has been promoted by various celebrities, like the journalist Jesús Quintero and in his discography, he makes versions of famous songs of singers like Bambino, Rocío Jurado, Chavela Vargas and Paco Ibáñez, among others.

According to Jesús Quintero, Falete very much "feels like an artist, dreams like an artist, loves like an artist, and suffers like one too. He lives for art; he doesn't see any boundaries between life and art." It's not surprising to see that he's very comfortable with ambiguity and embraces it as part of his lifestyle and his sexuality, becoming an icon for liberal sexual and body attitudes and defying stereotypes. He's an artist that cannot be pigeonholed – a refreshing figure in the more traditional flamenco and copla scene.

Discography 
Sin censura", 2012¿Quién te crees tú?, 2008 Coplas que nos han matao, 2007Puta Mentira, 2006Amar duele'', 2004

References

External links
 

1978 births
Living people
People from Seville
Romani singers
Flamenco singers
LGBT Romani people
Spanish LGBT singers
Spanish Romani people
Spanish Roman Catholics
LGBT Roman Catholics
Gay singers
21st-century Spanish male singers
Spanish gay musicians
20th-century Spanish LGBT people
21st-century Spanish LGBT people
LGBT people in Latin music